Randy Katana (born Randy Joubert on 14 March 1965 in Saint Martin) is a popular Tribal-Tech-Trance DJ. He is also known as Phantom, Noski, Katana, and DJ Randy.

He is a prominent producer, and a pioneer of the Tribal-Tech-Trance genre, hitting hard on the trance club scene with a track called Play it Loud. It was followed up with many remixes, including the appropriately named Play it Louder. His previous tracks, One solid wave" and "In Silence, were also huge successes, being played by DJs such as Paul van Dyk, Armin van Buuren, Tiësto, and were also featuring on many CD compilations.

Biography

Randy Katana originally came from the Dutch Antillean Islands (Aruba, Curaçao and St Martin), where for many years he worked as resident DJ at many of the trendiest clubs on the Islands. He also spend many years playing drums in Brass Bands, which on the islands where specialized in Carnival music. This is where Randy acquired the Latin tribal soul that he projects in his music today.

1992 - 2003
 
Randy Katana has been pioneering the Dutch dance sounds for well over two decades now. He founded the legendary Jinx and BPM Dance label collective (2 Play, Silver Premium, Tri Lamb, Smoke Free DJ Tools, Bango) that spearheaded the development of trance music as we know it today, finding & developing production talent such as Signum, Mac Zimms (Starkillers) and Mark Norman along the way.
 
2003 - 2007
 
Randy is no stranger to the studio himself, and is one of the most influential and forward thinking Tech Trance producers of our generation. Producing under the name Katana at first, then DJ Randy, and more recently Randy Katana, there are few producers who can claim to have been in vogue and in demand in what is a rapidly changing scene. It wasn't until the summer of 2003, when Randy's involvement in label management reached a crossroads that made him decide to become a full-time DJ.
 
After a tryout at one of the biggest clubs in Amsterdam he was immediately accepted as resident DJ at XL (Kingdom), and his DJing progress since has been nothing short of phenomenal. Randy Katana became one of the fastest growing artists in the Netherlands over the next year, the most booked international DJ in Spain, and played countries like Poland, Malta, Crete, Sweden, Norway, France, UK, Scotland, Ireland, Germany, Luxembourg, Ukraine, Romania, Switzerland, Italy, Turkey, Morocco, Colombia, Brazil, Malaysia, Indonesia, South-Africa and Australia. In Madrid he headlined the Fabrik White Party together with Judge Jules for a capacity crowd of 7000, while in the Netherlands he performed at some of the biggest festivals, including Dance Valley (Summer and Winter editions), Trance Energy, Beachpop, Almere Free Festival and loads more, Randy's rise through the DJ ranks was in overdrive and fuelled by some of his biggest productions to date.
 
Hot on the heels of his massive releases 'Fancy Fair', 'Alesis' and 'Dulce Vita', that were hammered by every A-list trance DJ on the planet, Randy followed up with the awesome 'In Silence', awarded 'Best Track Of The Year' in the 2004 www.tranceaddict.com poll, and in 2005 came 'Pleasure Island', remixes of 'Fancy Fair' and one of the biggest dance anthems of the year in 'Play It Loud'. Moving into 2006 and Randy's DJ diary features virtually every major events in Europe, including Planet Love, Goodgreef, Ministry of Sound, Gatecrasher, The Gallery, The Vaults, Inside Out and Slinky in the UK, plus massive one-off events in eastern Europe, South Africa, Scandinavia, Ibiza, Australia and beyond.
 
2007 - 2011
 
After releasing his album 'Spirit of the Drums' late 2007 and focusing on re-inventing his typical KATANA-sound in 2008/ 2009, he charges effortlessly to number one in the charts again, with the massive tracks You & I, The Hype & Derb, and became the 5th DJ in the world in 2010 ever to play in Ulaanbaatar, Mongolia (the coldest city on earth).
 
Always adapting his unique and successful sound to a new style, he starts his own label “Katana Beatz” in 2011. The style of music, that will be released on this label, will range from Tech Trance to Tech House, and mostly Progressive House.
 
Crowds all over the world flock to experience his pioneering, surprising, captivating and energetic uplifting sets, that keeps them craving for more, and provides him the true & well-earned worldwide recognition.
Always trying to bring something new & refreshing to the dance scene, he keeps on looking & moving forward, re-inventing his unique sound along the way.

Discography

Releases
From 1992 to 2000:

 
Katana – Sexual Intimidation

Katana – Erotmania

Katana – Erotmania (The Remixes)

Katana – A Silent Prayer

Katana – Kyrie

Katana – Pyrexia (feat: Shila)

Katana – Feels Like Magic (Feat: Shila)

Katana – Bad Girls

Phantom – Face the Mastermind

Phantom – The Abyss

Misjahroon – Turn Me On (Phantom Remix)

M.A.D. Mad - Action

DJ Randy – Deception

DJ Randy – Deep Dive

DJ Randy – Drums Please

DJ Randy – Dungeons

DJ Randy – Electra

DJ Randy – Enter Load

DJ Randy – Estece

DJ Randy – More and More

DJ Randy & Mac Zimms – In the Pink

DJ Randy – Monkey Shines

DJ Randy – Pandomia

DJ Randy – Techno Train

Antic – Digital Mass

Antic – Converter

Antic – Santana

Antic – T.T. Express

Antic – The Ultimata

Antic – Copy Cat

Antic – Pulse

Album:

Undefined Sounds

From 2001 to 2005:

Viframa – Cristale (Randy Katana Trance mix)

Viframa – Cristale (Randy Katana’s Intro mix)

Randy Katana - Alesiss

Randy Katana – Dolce Vita

Katana – Fancy Fair

Katana – Gemini

Randy Katana – Say Yes

Randy Katana – Tribal Shock

Randy Katana – Darude (Unreleased)

Randy Katana – One Solid Wave

Randy Katana – Pleasure Island

Randy Katana – Play it Loud

Randy Katana – Play it Louder

Randy Katana & Mac Zimms – PING (unreleased)

Randy Katana & PG2 – Trance Central

Yves the Ruiter – The Rebel (DJ Randy Mix)

DJ Sammy – In Musika (Randy Katana mix)

DJ Sammy – L’B Habba (Randy Katana mix)

Scott Mac – Angel (Randy Katana mix)

Abel Ramos – Aquarius (Randy Katana mixes)

Abel Ramos – Atasco (Randy Katana mix)

Signum – Cura Me (Randy Katana mix)

From 2005 to 2010:

Randy Katana – Sex

Randy Katana – Fancy Fair (2005 remix)

Randy Katana – Another Wave

Randy Katana – Another Edit (Another Wave Remix)(Unreleased)

Randy Katana – Electro Shock (Unreleased)

Randy Katana – Plastic Fantastic

Randy Katana – Session Imposable

Randy Katana & Mac Zimms – 2 in 1

Randy Katana – And then the Bass

A&G – Blow Your Speakers (Randy Katana mix)

Randy Katana & Mac Zimms – Bring it On

Randy Katana – Filling the Gap

Randy Katana – Freak Bass
 
Randy Katana – In Silence (Remixes)

Randy Katana – Latino

Randy Katana – Last One

Randy Katana – Tribal Train

Randy Katana – Back In Time

Randy Katana – Go Tech (Feat: DJ MEM)

Randy Katana – You & I

Randy Katana – The Hype

Randy Katana – Durp

Randy Katana – High Tech

Ron vd Beuken – Access (Randy Katana mix)

Phillip D – Airport (Randy Katana mix)

Album:

Spirit of the Drums

From 2011 to 2012:

Organ Donors – MotherFoogin (Randy Katana mix)

Randy Katana – Return of the Wave

Randy Katana – Second Phase

Randy Katana – Dot Com (unreleased)

Randy Katana Feat: Ruben Vitalis - Lookers in Wonderland (unreleased)

Randy Katana – I’m not so famous but f..k me anyway (unreleased)

Other Remixes

 Bodyrox - Yeah Yeah (Randy Katana Edit)
 DJ Albert & Precision - Say Yes (Katana Remix)
 DJ Danjo & Rob Styles - Witness (Katana Remix)
 Drax & Scott Mac - Angel (Katana Remix)
 Goldenscan - Of Our Times (Katana's 'Randy Katana' Remix)
 Katana - Feels Like Magic (The Remix)
 Diane Avery - Hello! (Katana Remix)

References

External links
 https://www.facebook.com/RandyKatanaOfficial
 http://www.combeatz.com/C_Site/index.html
 Official Randy Katana Myspace Page
 Randy Katana at Discogs.com
 Randy Katana at iTunes

Living people
Dutch DJs
1965 births
Dutch trance musicians
Electronic dance music DJs